O Chun-bok is a North Korean politician. She served as Minister of Health in the Cabinet of North Korea and as candidate member of the Central Committee of the Workers' Party of Korea.

Biography
In 2019 she was appointed as Minister of Health in the Cabinet led by Premier of North Korea, Kim Jae-ryong, and was elected as a candidate for the Central Committee of the Workers 'Party of Korea at the 4th Plenum of the 7th Central Committee of the 7th Congress of the Workers' Party of Korea in April 2019.

References

Workers' Party of Korea politicians
Health ministers of North Korea
Living people
Year of birth missing (living people)